The 2013–14 Minnesota Golden Gophers women's basketball team represented the University of Minnesota in the 2013-14 college basketball season. Led by 12th year head coach Pam Borton for the Golden Gophers, members of the Big Ten Conference, played their home games at Williams Arena in Minneapolis, Minnesota. They finished with a record of 22–13 overall, 8–8 in Big Ten play for a tie for sixth place. They lost in the quarterfinals in the 2014 Big Ten Conference women's basketball tournament to Nebraska. They were invited to the 2014 Women's National Invitation Tournament which they defeated Green Bay in the first round, SMU in the second round before losing to South Dakota State in the third round.

Roster

2013–14 schedule and results

|-
! colspan="9" style="text-align: center; background:#800000" | Exhibition 

|-
! colspan="9" style="text-align: center; background:#800000"|Regular season

|-
! colspan="9" style="text-align: center; background:#800000"|Big Ten regular season

|-
! colspan="9" style="text-align: center; background:#800000"|2014 Big Ten tournament

|-
! colspan="9" style="text-align: center; background:#800000"|2014 WNIT

Source

See also
 2013–14 Minnesota Golden Gophers men's basketball team

References

Minnesota Golden Gophers women's basketball seasons
Minnesota
2014 Women's National Invitation Tournament participants
Minnesota Golden
Minnesota Golden